Indonesia men's national goalball team is the men's national team of Indonesia.  Goalball is a team sport designed specifically for athletes with a vision impairment.  The team takes part in international competitions.

Competitive records

Asian Para Games

ASEAN Para Games

References 

Indonesia men's national goalball team
National men's goalball teams
Indonesia at the Paralympics
Goalball in Asia